Nicolas Dieuze (born February 7, 1979) is a French former professional football  midfielder.

He signed for Grenoble from Le Havre AC on July 31, 2009.

References

External links
 
 

Sportspeople from Albi
1979 births
Living people
French footballers
Association football midfielders
Toulouse FC players
SC Bastia players
Le Havre AC players
Grenoble Foot 38 players
Ligue 1 players
Ligue 2 players
Footballers from Occitania (administrative region)